The Human Resource Development Council (HRDC) is a not-for-profit corporation based in Bozeman, Montana in the United States, providing volunteer and community development organization in three counties - Gallatin, Park and Meagher Counties. It was founded in 1975.

HRDC occupies one of Bozeman's notable historical buildings, the first Federal Building and Post Office built in 1915.

External links
 Human Resource Development Council

Non-profit organizations based in Montana
Community development organizations
Organizations established in 1975